Suelli, Sueddi in sardinian language, is a comune (municipality) in the Province of South Sardinia in the Italian region Sardinia, located about  north of Cagliari.

Suelli borders the following municipalities: Gesico, Mandas, Selegas, Senorbì, Siurgus Donigala.

Demographic evolution

References

Cities and towns in Sardinia